Noddy is an English character created by English children's author Enid Blyton. Noddy first appeared in a book series published between 1949 and 1963, illustrated by the Dutch artist Harmsen van der Beek from 1949 until his death in 1953, after which the work was continued by Peter Wienk. Television shows based on the character have run on British television since 1955.

Noddy
The first book explains Noddy's origins. He is made by a woodcarver in a toy store but runs away after the man begins to make a wooden lion, which scares Noddy. As he wanders through the woods naked, penniless, and homeless, he meets Big Ears, a friendly brownie. Big Ears decides that Noddy is a toy and takes him to live in Toyland. He generously provides Noddy with a set of clothing and a house. While Noddy is quite happy to be a toy, the citizens of Toyland are not sure that he actually is one. They put Noddy on trial and examine whether he is a toy or an ornament. Eventually, Noddy is declared a toy, but still has to convince the court that he is a good toy. The judge accepts that Noddy is good after a doll tells the court that he saved her little girl from a lion, and he is allowed to stay in Toyland. Noddy gets his car in the second book. It is given to him after he helps solve a local mystery.
 
The other toys can hear him coming by the distinctive "Parp Parp" sound of his car's horn and the jingle of the bell on his blue hat. Often he uses his car to visit all of the places in Toyland. When his taxi business is not doing so well, or when he needs help, Noddy turns to Big Ears. Big Ears will often lend him what he needs. On occasion, Noddy will allow people to make his head nod, in exchange for small items such as his morning milk.

Noddy is kind and honest, but he often gets into trouble, either through his own misunderstandings or because someone, usually one of the naughty goblins Sly or Gobbo, has played a trick on him. He is very childlike in his understanding of the world and often becomes confused as a result. For example, in the first Noddy book, Noddy and Big Ears are building Noddy's house for one. Noddy suggests that they build the roof first, in case it rains. With no understanding of gravity or of the need for roof supports, this is perfectly logical to him. As the series continues, Noddy becomes wiser but without losing his charm and lovable naivety.
 
Noddy's best friends are Big Ears, Tessie Bear, Bumpy Dog, and the Tubby Bears. Big Ears, who brought Noddy to Toyland, is the most important figure in his life.  Whenever he faces serious peril, it tends to be Big Ears who comes to the rescue, one way or another, and it is invariably Big Ears to whom Noddy turns for support and reassurance.  Big Ears is not so much a parental figure, but more like a guardian, or perhaps Noddy's attorney. While kind to Noddy, Big Ears has an intimidating presence and voice that makes him feared by goblins. He is capable of facing down wizards with his own spells, and is able to plead Noddy's case to Mr. Plod, the local policeman, when Noddy finds himself in legal peril. On rare occasions, however, Big Ears finds himself in trouble, in which case Noddy comes to his aid. Big Ears and Noddy have rarely quarreled seriously. Examples of such quarrels are when Big Ears harshly scolded the very sensitive Tessie Bear for failing to control her dog and when Noddy ran his car into Big Ears's clothes post and then drove away, dragging Big Ears's clean washing behind him.

Tessie is a gentle-hearted, gold bear who often wears a bonnet with flowers and a skirt. She is young like Noddy, and very loving towards all of her friends and neighbours. Bumpy Dog is Tessie's pet. He loves to run up and "bump" people over. Noddy frequently gets annoyed with Bumpy but still likes him. Whenever Noddy threatens Bumpy, Tessie gets upset, and sometimes even begins to cry. The Tubby Bears live next door to Noddy. They are gold and chubby teddy bears. Mr. and Mrs. Tubby Bear frequently help Noddy. It is clear that Mr. and Mrs. Tubby Bear are the superiors of Noddy, as if he were a child. Their first names are never mentioned and Noddy always refers to them as Mr. and Mrs. They have one son, also named Tubby, who is occasionally referred to as Master Tubby. Tubby is naughty and is usually in trouble for breaking rules, being rude, or doing something wrong. Noddy often attempts to scold or punish Tubby, with little result. On one occasion, Tubby gets tired of always being bossed around and being punished and decides to run away to sea. Noddy and Bumpy accidentally join with him. By the end of the journey, Tubby misses his parents and brings them back presents from his trip, as an apology.

Noddy has many run-ins with Mr. Plod. Some are caused by Noddy's lack of understanding of how Toyland works. Other times it is because of a case of mistaken identity, Mr. Plod is generally long-suffering towards Noddy and Noddy likes Mr. Plod and frequently goes out of his way to help him. Mr. Plod often catches the mischief makers on his police bicycle, by blowing his whistle and shouting "Halt in the name of Plod!!" before locking the culprits up in his jail.

Inspiration
It is said that Enid Blyton took inspiration for Noddy from the village of Studland in Dorset where she would holiday virtually every summer. A small copse nearby was said to be Noddy's Wood. PC Christopher Rhone whom Blyton met while he was on the beat came to be immortalised as PC Plod in the Noddy books, and the national archetype of a flatfooted copper.

Characters

Current characters

Major characters
 Big Ears, a wise, bearded gnome who lives in a toadstool house outside of Toyland and is Noddy's helper and father figure, as well as his best friend. He finds Noddy and brings him to Toyland at the start of the first book. Big Ears, while usually kind to Noddy, can be very fierce and is both feared and respected by goblins, wizards, and even Mr. Plod. Whenever Noddy is being mistreated, he invariably comes to his defence. Big Ears also has the power to cast magic spells, though he rarely uses it. His catchphrase is "You funny little Noddy!", and he made his animation debut in the 2002 computer-animated television series Make Way for Noddy.
 Tessie Bear, a clever young female teddy bear who is Noddy's friend. She was instead replaced by a female panda named Pat-Pat.
 Mr. Plod (sometimes called PC Plod), the Toyland policeman. He has an uneven relationships with Noddy, who he thinks drives too fast and engages in other unwarranted behaviour. He has gone so far as to imprison Noddy at least once, and threatened him with imprisonment on other occasions. His catchphrase is "Stop, in the name of Plod!", as shown in Make Way for Noddy.
 Bumpy Dog, a dog from the original books who lives with Tessie Bear, but he also accompanies Noddy on many adventures. Noddy first met the Bumpy Dog in Toytown because he was injured and Noddy used his scarf to help him. Noddy felt he was unable to have Bumpy Dog live with him, so Tessie Bear offered to keep him.
Dinah Doll, a china doll who sells all kinds of everything in the market. She is a later addition, previously written out of the original books.
 Sly and Gobbo, mischievous goblins. They usually steal things such as ice cream, coins or Noddy's car. Unlike other characters, they are the only ones not to appear (or at least not nearly as much) in Enid Blyton's original books.

Recurring characters
Mr. Wobblyman, a roly-poly toy who has a round base which he wobbles about on. He rocks back and forth to get around. In the episode, Noddy's Perfect Gift, it is shown that he may be the owner of the fruit shop in the town square. His catchphrase is I hate it when that happens.
 Master Tubby Bear, Mr. and Mrs. Tubby Bear's son who is sometimes called Bruiny. He was naughty in the books and older television series, but he was better behaved in Make Way for Noddy.
Mr. Sparks, Toyland's handyman who can mend anything. His catchphrase is "A challenge? I like it!"
 Clockwork Mouse, a toy mouse who often requires winding up.
 Miss Harriet the Pink Cat (aka Miss Pink Cat), a French pink cat who sells ice cream. She is portrayed as a fussy and neat cat with no patience for foolishness, even her own.
 Mr. Jumbo, an elephant who is friends with Clockwork Mouse.
 Martha Monkey, a mischievous tomboy who replaced naughty schoolboy Gilbert Golly.
 The Skittles, a family consisting of Sally Skittle and her many children of various sizes. The Skittles are red and yellow in colour with black hands. They like being knocked down and frequently run out in front of Noddy's car so he will hit them and knock them over.
 Mr. Train Driver, the train driver who drives the Toyland Express train.
 Twinkly, a star who has appeared in "Catch a Falling Star."
 Clockwork Clown, a toy clown who performs funny tricks. He stands only using his hands, not his feet, as he has "fused" feet like those of a sea lion.
 Noddy's Car, the yellow car with red decals which Noddy drives. It has a brain of its own and can talk to other characters with its unique sounding horn that says "parp parp!" as its catchphrase.

Minor characters
 Bert Monkey, a shy and timid monkey with a sentient and mischievous tail.
 Sammy Sailor, local harbour sailor.
 Mr. Noah, lives on the ark with Mrs. Noah and the animals.
 Mrs. Noah, lives on the ark with Mr. Noah and the animals.
 Stinky, a tramp who has never washed in his life.
 Mr. Tubby Bear, Noddy's next door neighbour. First name is unknown.
 Mrs. Tubby Bear, Noddy's next door neighbour. In the original books, it was clear that she, like Mr. Tubby Bear, are the superiors of Noddy, as if they are adults and he is a child, mainly because Noddy always refers to them as "Mr. and Mrs. Tubby Bear". Like Mr. Tubby Bear, first name is unknown.
 Teddy Tubby Bear, Mr. Tubby Bear's brother, Mrs. Tubby Bear's brother-in-law and Master Tubby Bear's uncle, who appeared in the third book, Noddy and His Car.
 Little Ears, Big Ears' brother who looks just like Big Ears. However, his ears are much smaller. He lives in a very tidy toadstool just like Big Ears.
 Bunkey, a thoroughly mischievous character who appears to be half bunny and half monkey. He is later exposed as a fraudulent monkey who escaped from a travelling circus.
 Miss Prim, the school mistress who replaced the slipper-wielding Miss Rap.
 Mr. Milko, the local milkman.

Former characters
Mr. Golly, in the books was the owner of the Toyland garage. He was replaced by Mr. Sparks in the TV series in the early 1990s and later editions of the original books on redrawn pages. 
 Tricky Teddy, a teddy bear and companion of Gilbert Golly of mischief; in later adaptations they were replaced by a pair of teddy bears and finally by the Goblins Sly and Gobbo.
 Gilbert Golly a gollywog and another villain.

Noddy books

Early Noddy books have become collectibles, along with other Blytons. The total number is hard to count: the Noddy Library (Sampson Low) of two dozen titles, which became the New Noddy Library when revised, was just part of a big production in the 1950s, with Big Noddy Books of larger format, and strip books. There were numerous spin-offs, also. Widely differing estimates can be found.

The 24 original Noddy books by Enid Blyton were published between 1949 and 1963. Harmsen Van der Beek illustrated the first 7 Noddy books.  After Beek's death in 1953 the original style was maintained by illustrators Robert Tyndall, Peter Wienk, Mary Brooks and Robert Lee.

Sales of Noddy books are large, with an estimated 600,000 annual sales in France alone, and growing popularity in India, a large market for Blyton books. The Noddy character was formerly owned by Chorion, who sold the rights on to DreamWorks Classics (a part of DreamWorks Animation which now a subsidiary of NBCUniversal) in 2012.

Noddy Goes to Toyland (1949)
Hurrah for Little Noddy (1950)
Noddy and His Car (1951)
Here Comes Noddy Again! (1951)
Well Done Noddy! (1952)
Noddy Goes to School  (1952)
Noddy at the Seaside (1953)
Noddy Gets into Trouble (1954)
Noddy and the Magic Rubber (1954)
You Funny Little Noddy (1955)
Noddy Meets Father Christmas (1955)
Noddy and Tessie Bear (1956)
Be Brave, Little Noddy! (1956)
Noddy and the Bumpy-Dog (1957)
Do Look Out, Noddy (1957)
You're a Good Friend, Noddy (1958)
Noddy Has an Adventure (1958)
Noddy Goes to Sea (1959)
Noddy and the Bunkey (1959)
Cheer Up, Little Noddy! (1960)
Noddy Goes to the Fair (1960)
Mr. Plod and Little Noddy (1961)
Noddy and the Tootles (1962)
Noddy and the Aeroplane (1963)

(Only 24 in the set)

Separate Book: Noddy and Big-Ears  (1952)

On 17 November 2008, it was announced that Enid Blyton's granddaughter, Sophie Smallwood, was to write a new Noddy book to celebrate the character's 60th birthday. Noddy and the Farmyard Muddle (2009) was illustrated by Robert Tyndall, who has drawn the characters in the Noddy books since 1953, ever since the death of the original illustrator, Harmsen van der Beek.

Television adaptations productions and incarnations
In the 1990s and early 2000s TV series adaptation, as well as a new series of books, Noddy has been updated, with the original Golliwog characters replaced by other sorts of toys. For example, Mr. Golly who ran the Toyland garage was replaced by Frenchman Monsieur Polly in the 1975 series, and, during the 1992–1999 series, by Mr. Sparks. Dinah Doll, described as "a black, assertive minority female", was added to the franchise by then.

The Adventures of Noddy (1955-1962) - a black and white puppet series on ATV.
Noddy Goes to Toyland (1963) - A 2D animated short film made by the works of Arthur Humberstone Films.
Noddy (1975-1976) - A series produced for ITV by Cosgrove Hall Films' predecessor company Stop Frame Productions.
The Further Adventures of Noddy (1983) - A stop-frame animated pilot made by the works of FilmFair.
Noddy's Toyland Adventures (1992-2000) - The BBC's first adaptation of the Noddy franchise and the most famous adaptation. Produced by Cosgrove Hall Films.
The Noddy Shop (1998–2001) - Canadian/American adaptation featuring redubbed animations from Noddy's Toyland Adventures, released in other English speaking territories as "Noddy in Toyland".  
Make Way for Noddy (2002) - The first CGI series of Noddy which was commissioned by Channel 5 and aired as apart of their Milkshake! block. Produced by Chorion in association with SD Entertainment who did the animation.
Noddy in Toyland (2009) - The second Noddy series to be made in CGI for the 60th anniversary of the franchise. Produced by Chorion in association with Brown Bag Films. 
Noddy, Toyland Detective (2016-2020) - DreamWorks' reimagining of the franchise and overall the third CGI incarnation of the character to be produced to date.

Adaptations

Noddy first appeared on stage at the 2660-seat Stoll Theatre in Kingsway, London, in 1954. The very large cast were all children or teenagers, mostly from the Italia Conti acting school. There was a full theatre orchestra. The finale was a scene at the "Faraway Tree", with many of the children dressed as fairies, flying on wires. It ran for several years, but the Stoll was knocked down and replaced by an office block in the late 1950s. The Peacock Theatre was built in the basement of the new building, but Noddy did not return.

In 1963, Noddy was featured in the animated short film Noddy Goes to Toyland, it was produced by Arthur Humberstone for Enid Blyton.

In 1993, a stage production of Noddy opened at Wimbledon Theatre, followed by a long UK national tour, including a Christmas season in London at the Lyric Theatre, Hammersmith, and was released on home video in 1994. The production was presented by Clarion Productions. The production was written and directed by David Wood with scene and costume designs by Susie Calcutt. The original cast included Eric Potts as Big Ears and Karen Briffett as Noddy. The show was very well received among critics, audiences and even Enid Blyton's daughter Gillian Baverstock. David Wood adapted a successful sequel to the play entitled "Noddy and the Tootle" which opened at the Wimbledon Theatre and endured on a long UK National Tour in 1995–1996. Karen Briffett reprised her role as Noddy and Big Ears was played by Jonathan Broxholme. This production was too presented by Clarion Productions.

The characters returned during September 2002 for a computer-animated series, which was named Make Way for Noddy. This was created by Chorion, in association with SD Entertainment and the 100 episodes were produced in 2001 externally.

In 2005, a set of 100 new two-minute TV interstitials were created by Chorion. These interstitials, entitled Say it with Noddy, feature Noddy learning words in a variety of foreign languages. They also introduced Noddy's new friend Whizz from Robot Village, who presses a button on his chest to play recordings of native speakers saying the new foreign words Noddy was to learn. The interstitials were featured on commercial breaks on Five and featured as segments for the American release of the show on PBS and Sprout.

A CG animated series, called Noddy in Toyland, was made in 2009 by Chorion and produced by Brown Bag Films in Ireland. This series incorporates Whizz from "Say it with Noddy" as a full-time character. Sly and Gobbo's cousins, Sneaky and Stealth, are introduced and usually work alongside them. The full series is available digitally on iTunes.

In 2012, Chorion sold the Noddy character to ClassicMedia, which in turn was bought out by DreamWorks Animation, leading to another CG animated series, named Noddy, Toyland Detective was produced by French producer/distributor Gaumont Animation, in association with DreamWorks Animation Television, and in partnership with France Télévisions. It premiered on Channel Five's preschool block Milkshake! on 18 April 2016.

Other media
There was a spoof page of "Noddy-ana" in Hot Rod magazine (U.K.), in about 1976–1978; Noddy had a hot rod, and Big Ears smoked, and was very disrespectful to Mr. Plod.

In the book Seven Deadly Wonders by Matthew Reilly, a character is nicknamed Noddy, while his best friend's nickname is Big Ears.

IDW's The Transformers introduced the character of "Tappet", a robot who is based on Noddy visually and clearly transforms into Noddy's classic car.

The puppet of Big Ears from the 1955–1963 Noddy television series appeared as a member of the "Puppet Government" in The Goodies episode "The Goodies Rule – O.K.?".

In Alan Moore's series The League of Extraordinary Gentlemen, Toyland is a real nation located in the Arctic Circle. The King and Queen of Toyland are Frankenstein's Monster and Olympia, the automaton from The Tales of Hoffmann.

Noddy, Big Ears and PC Plod are referred to in the Two Ronnies crossword sketch where Ronnie Corbett thinks their names are "Roddy, Big Ears, and PC Plop!"

In an episode of Last of the Summer Wine, all of the characters are dressed up as fairy tale characters for a parade. Smiler is dressed as Noddy complete with a smaller version of his car in order to tow a bouncy castle with the rest of the characters on it, but it deflated while they were taking part.

Derivative uses
Noddy being associated with small children's reading has led to "Noddy" being sometimes used as an adjective meaning "petty or trivial" (compare with "Mickey Mouse"), for example, in computer programming: "This simultaneous linear equation subroutine crashes out on the Noddy case when n = 1, but otherwise it works." or "Remember to check all the Noddy cases."

In Britain the word plod became a derogatory term to describe a police officer due to the success of the Noddy franchise, and its character PC Plod. For example somebody could say, “I’m not having a good morning, I was driving to work this morning and got pulled over by the plod for driving too fast”

He inspired the nickname of Slade vocalist/guitarist Neville "Noddy" Holder.

See also 
Toytown was a BBC radio series for children, broadcast for Children's Hour on the Home Service from 1929. It featured Larry The Lamb as its chief character.

References

External links

 
 Noddy in Toyland on iTunes

Book series introduced in 1949
Characters in children's literature
Fictional taxi drivers
Fictional dolls and dummies
Enid Blyton characters
Enid Blyton series
DreamWorks Classics
DreamWorks Classics franchises
Literary characters introduced in 1949